Andrew Marr's History of Modern Britain is a 2007 BBC documentary television series presented by Andrew Marr that covers the period of British history from the end of the Second World War onwards. The series was highly praised, and resulted in a follow up series covering the period 1900 to 1945, Andrew Marr's The Making of Modern Britain. A book released by Marr accompanying the series and bearing the same name also details this period of history.

Episodes

Reception

Reviews
Fellow historian Tristram Hunt, writing in The Guardian, complimented Marr for his confrontational, argumentative, personalised history, stating that television history, done well, should be more of an ice-bath than a comforting, warm soak. Gareth McLean congratulated Marr for analysing the times in which he immerses himself, effortlessly communicating his enthusiasm, and hinting at fundamental truths of the human condition, which he stated was the future of factual programming. He was also impressed that Marr maintained his penetrating scrutiny and level of insight throughout the series. Lucy Mangan noted that the show shone a light of understanding into hitherto dark and musty corners of ignorance, but criticised the final episode for concentrating too much on Tony Blair's People's Princess speech after Princess Diana's death.

Complaints
In 2009, Marr's publisher, Macmillan Publishers, was successfully sued for libel by activist Erin Pizzey after his book A History of Modern Britain claimed she had once been part of the militant group Angry Brigade that staged bomb attacks in the 1970s. Pizzey became an opponent of the group and threatened to report their activities to the police when they discussed their intention of bombing Biba, a lively fashion store. The publisher also recalled and destroyed the offending version of the book, and republished it with the error removed.

A viewer complaint that Marr's comment on the community charge ("Unlike the old rates, it would be payable by everyone, not just homeowners") gave the inaccurate impression that householders who were tenants had not been liable for domestic rates. The BBC Editorial Complaints Unit upheld the complaint and promised the error would be corrected before any re-broadcast.

Awards

Book adaptation
A History of Modern Britain is a book written by Marr that coincided with his television documentary series of the same name. It was first published by Macmillan Publishers in 2007.

See also

 Andrew Marr's The Making of Modern Britain

References

External links
 

2007 British television series debuts
2000s British documentary television series
Political history of the United Kingdom
2007 British television series endings
Television series about the history of the United Kingdom
Contemporary British history
BBC television documentaries about history during the 20th Century
BBC television documentaries about history during the 21st Century